Nestor P. Redondo (May 4, 1928 – December 30, 1995) was a Filipino comics artist best known for his work for DC Comics, Marvel Comics, and other American publishers in the 1970s and early 1980s. In his native Philippines, he is known for co-creating the superheroine Darna.

Early life
Redondo was born May 4, 1928, in Candon, Ilocos Sur, in what was then the United States territory of the Philippine Islands. His brother, Francisco "Quico" Redondo, was a comics artist as well.

He studied architecture at the Mapúa Institute of Technology but left it to begin a career in illustration.

Career

Early work
Redondo began his career drawing Filipino komiks serials, which were written by his brother Virgilio, including Mars Ravelo's Darna series. In 1969 and 1970 Redondo did the four-page serial ”Mga Kasaysayang Buhat sa Bibliya” (“Tales from the Bible”) in each issue of Superyor Komiks Magasin, which was produced by his company Nestor Redondo Publications. This company launched a program of on-the-job training for young writers and artists.

U.S. work 
In the 1970s, Redondo began to do work for publishers in the United States. His earliest U.S. credit is penciling and inking the ten-page story "The King Is Dead", by writer Jack Oleck, in DC Comics' House of Mystery #194 (Sept. 1971). Through the 1970s, Redondo drew dozens of such supernatural anthology stories for DC titles including House of Secrets, The Phantom Stranger, Secrets of Sinister House, The Unexpected, Weird War Tales, and The Witching Hour. He drew six of the seven issues of Rima, the Jungle Girl (May 1974 – March 1975), based on the heroine of a Victorian novel, as well as Swamp Thing #11–23 (Aug. 1974 – July 1976), and DC's tabloid-sized one-shot collection of Bible stories, cover-titled The Bible but officially titled Limited Collectors' Edition #C-36 (July 1975). Nestor Redondo and his brother Frank Redondo often collaborated and were credited together as the "Redondo Studio", including on the Ragman series for DC.

In 1970, Redondo was approached by Vincent Fago of Pendulum Press to illustrate stories for that publisher’s new line of comic book adaptations of literary classics. Redondo helped Fago recruit fellow Filipino comics artists, who illustrated almost every comic Pendulum produced. From 1973 to 1979, Redondo illustrated many stories in the Pendulum Illustrated Classics line, including Dracula and Dr. Jekyll and Mr. Hyde — adaptations which were reprinted by Marvel Comics three years later as Marvel Classics Comics. Other adaptations illustrated by Redondo for Pendulum included The Great Adventures of Sherlock Holmes, some Edgar Allan Poe stories, The Odyssey, and Romeo and Juliet. In addition, Redondo illustrated a Pendulum comic-book history of the American Civil War, and biographies of Madame Curie, Albert Einstein, and Abraham Lincoln.

In the mid-1980s, Redondo inked the Eclipse Comics time-travel series Aztec Ace, by writer Doug Moench and pencilers Michael Hernandez and Dan Day. In 1990, he contributed to the second issue of the Marvel Comics superhero series Solarman as well as to an issue of Innovation Comics' Legends of the Stargrazers. Redondo collaborated with writer Roy Thomas on an adaptation of Robert E. Howard's Marchers of Valhalla in the mid-1990s, but the finished comic book never saw print.

Christian comics 
More regularly, Redondo contributed to various Christian comics. In addition to DC Comics' 1975 one-shot collection of Bible stories, Redondo illustrated Marx, Lenin, Mao and Christ, published in 1977 by Open Doors (and reprinted in 2010 by Calvary Comics); Pendulum's Ben-Hur, published in 1978; Born Again Comics #2 (featuring the story of Filipino actor-turned-evangelist Fred Galang) in 1988; and Aida-Zee, Behold 3-D, and Christian Comics & Games #0 and #1, produced in the 1990s by The Nate Butler Studio. Redondo was a panelist for the first Christian-comics panel of San Diego Comic-Con in 1992.

In preparation for the First International Christian Comics Training Conference in Tagaytay, the Philippines, in January 1996, Redondo wrote On Realistic Illustration for his main teaching session, but died before he was able to deliver it personally.

Death 
Redondo was living in Los Angeles County, California, at the time of his death on December 30, 1995.

Awards
In 1979, Redondo received the Inkpot Award at the San Diego Comic-Con.

Bibliography

Continuity Comics
 The Revengers Featuring Megalith #3 (1986)

DC Comics
 
 The Amazing World of DC Comics #6 (two pages) (1975)
 Ghosts #8, 13 (1972–1973)
 G.I. Combat #240 (1982) 
 House of Mystery #194–195, 197, 202–203, 211, 214, 217, 219, 226–227, 229, 235, 241, 287, 302, 308 (1971–1982)
 House of Secrets #95, 99, 102, 104, 113, 116, 134, 139–140 (1971–1976) 
 Limited Collectors' Edition #C–36 (The Bible) (1975) 
 Phantom Stranger vol. 2 #32, 35–36 (Black Orchid) (1974–1975) 
 Rima, the Jungle Girl #1–6 (1974–1975) 
 Secrets of Haunted House #3–5, 29 (1975–1980) 
 Secrets of Sinister House #7 (1972) 
 Sgt. Rock #307 (1977) 
 Swamp Thing #11–23 (1974–1976)
 Tales of Ghost Castle #1 (1975)
 Tarzan #232 (one page) (1974) 
 The Unexpected #133, 155, 162, 192, 195 (1972–1980) 
 Weird Mystery Tales #9 (1973) 
 Weird War Tales #13, 51 (1973–1977) 
 The Witching Hour #20–21, 23, 34, 65 (1972–1976)

Eclipse Comics
 Aztec Ace #1–8 (1984)

Innovation Publishing
 Legends of the Stargrazers #1 (1989)

Marvel Comics
 Marvel Classics Comics #1 (Dr. Jekyll and Mr. Hyde); #9 (Dracula) (1976)
 Official Handbook of the Marvel Universe #3–4, 8, 13–14 (1983–1984)
 Official Handbook of the Marvel Universe Deluxe Edition #3, 9, 18–19 (1986–1987)
 Red Sonja vol. 3 #2–3 (1983) 
 Savage Sword of Conan #51, 85, 90 (1980–1983) 
 Solarman #2 (1990)

Nate Butler Studio, Inc.
 Aida-Zee #1 (1990)
 The Monster tract (1992)
 Behold 3-D #1 (1996)
 Christian Comics & Games #0 (1996)
 Christian Comics & Games #1 (1997)

Pacific Comics
 Alien Worlds #1 (1982)

Pendulum Press 
 Pendulum Illustrated Classics
 Dr. Jekyll and Mr. Hyde (1973) – reprinted in Marvel Classics Comics #1 (1976)
 Dracula (1973) — reprinted in Marvel Classics Comics #9 (1976)
 Sir Arthur Conan Doyle: The Great Adventures of Sherlock Holmes (1974)
 Ben-Hur: A Tale of the Christ (1978)
 The Odyssey (1979)	
 Romeo and Juliet (1979)

 Basic Illustrated History of America
 The Civil War, 1850-1876 (1976)

 Pendulum Illustrated Biography Series
 Abraham Lincoln (1979)
 Madame Curie/Albert Einstein (1979)

Peter Pan Records
 Battle for the Planet of the Apes ##PR21 (1974)
 Beneath the Planet of the Apes #PR20 (1974)
 Escape from the Planet of the Apes #PR19 (1974)
 Planet of the Apes #PR18 (1974)

Warren Publishing
 1994 #21 (1981)
 The Rook #12 (1981)

Western Publishing
 The Twilight Zone #62 (1975)

References

External links
 Graphic Classics - Redondo
 
 Nestor Redondo at Mike's Amazing World of Comics
 Nestor Redondo at the Unofficial Handbook of Marvel Comics Creators

1928 births
1995 deaths
20th-century Filipino artists
DC Comics people
Filipino animators
Filipino Christians
Filipino comics artists
Filipino emigrants to the United States
Inkpot Award winners
Mapúa University alumni
Marvel Comics people
People from Ilocos Sur
Silver Age comics creators
Christian comics creators